The omnibus progression in music is a chord progression characterized by chromatic lines moving in opposite directions. The progression has its origins in the various Baroque harmonizations of the descending chromatic fourth in the bass ostinato pattern of passacaglia, known as the "lament bass". However, in its fullest form the omnibus progression involves a descent in the bass which traverses a whole octave and includes every note of the chromatic scale. It may also include one or more chromatic ascending tetrachords in the soprano, tenor and alto.

They are also known as "chromatic wedge progressions", in reference to their wedge-like appearance in score. The origin of the term "omnibus" (Latin: "for all") to describe such a sequence is unclear, but it is of note that the chord progression encompasses all of the notes in the chromatic scale.

A simple example 

The following example is in C major. The lowest part is a "lament bass" that descends from the tonic to the dominant using chromatic passing tones before returning at the end up to the tonic in a perfect cadence. The upper voice moves in the opposite direction from the dominant note up to the tonic. The chord names are given, followed where necessary by the inversion in figured bass. For example, 'Cm' refers to a C minor triad in second inversion, and G is a G dominant seventh in third inversion.

A more extended treatment of this version of the omnibus could be:

{|class="wikitable" style="text-align:center"
| C || G || B7 || Dm || B || G7 || Bm || G
|-
|width="35px"| E7 ||width="35px"| Gm ||width="35px"| E ||width="35px"| C7 ||width="35px"| Fm ||width="35px"| C ||width="35px"| B7|| width="35px" | Dm ||width="35px"| B ||width="35px"| G7 ||width="35px"| C
|}

For the purposes of composition, the pattern may be halted at any point, and in so doing may facilitate modulation to any desired key.

Dominant prolongation 

Modern theorists such as Telesco explain how small sections of omnibus progression (signified in example 1 by brackets around groups of chords) can be viewed as an instance of dominant prolongation achieved through voice exchange. Example 2 (above) is effectively a prolongation of the dominant seventh chord G7 which utilises chromatic voice movement. The bass voice descends chromatically while the upper voice ascends chromatically, and the inner voices remain stationary on the notes of D and F. Eventually the chromatic movement results in a new inversion of the dominant seventh chord G7, resolving to the tonic chord C.

References

Further reading 

 Kostka, Stefan, and Dorothy Payne. Tonal Harmony. 6th edition. New York: McGraw-Hill, 2009. (pp. 476–480)
 Laitz, Steven G. The Complete Musician. 2nd edition. New York: Oxford University Press, 2008. (pp. 845–846)

External links
Examples of the Omnibus, compiled by Prof. Timothy Cutler

Chord progressions